is a Japanese professional footballer who plays as a left back for Maruyasu Okazaki on the Japan Football League, on loan from J1 League club Yokohama F. Marinos.

Career statistics

Club
.

References

External links

2001 births
Living people
Association football people from Kanagawa Prefecture
Japanese footballers
Japan youth international footballers
Association football defenders
J3 League players
Japan Football League players
Yokohama F. Marinos players
SC Sagamihara players
Kamatamare Sanuki players
FC Maruyasu Okazaki players